Manoranjan Nath is an Indian politician belonging to Communist Party of India (Marxist). He was elected as MLA of Purbasthali Vidhan Sabha Constituency in West Bengal Legislative Assembly in 1977, 1982, 1987 and 1991.

References

Living people
Communist Party of India (Marxist) politicians
West Bengal MLAs 1977–1982
West Bengal MLAs 1982–1987
West Bengal MLAs 1987–1991
West Bengal MLAs 1991–1996
Year of birth missing (living people)